Mark E. Walsh was the Deputy Chief of Protocol of the United States from April 2011 to January 2017 and served as Acting Chief of Protocol in the final months of President Obama's second term.

He graduated from Boston University with a Bachelor of Arts in Political Science and Economics. He received his law degree from Boston University School of Law.

References 

Year of birth missing (living people)
Living people
United States Department of State officials
Boston University School of Law alumni